The following list includes all of the Canadian Register of Historic Places listings in Comox Valley Regional District, British Columbia.

References 

(references appear in the table above as external links)

Comox Valley Regional District